Eochagan (d 1042) was Archdeacon of Slane until his death in the mid 11th century. 

He was a celebrated author, Professor of Swords and a chronographer. He died at Cologne in Germany.

References 

1042 deaths
11th-century Irish priests
Archdeacons of Slane
Irish scholars and academics